Gein may refer to:
People
Ed Gein (1906–1984), American murderer
Gidget Gein (1969–2008), American musician and artist
Other
Ed Gein (band), a Syracuse grindcore band named after the serial killer
Gein metro station, also neighbourhood, in Amsterdam-Zuidoost
Gein, comic book character from Rurouni Kenshin, see list of characters